The Dizengoff Street bus bombing was a Hamas suicide attack on a passenger bus driving down Dizengoff Street in Tel Aviv in 1994. At that time, it was the deadliest suicide bombing in Israeli history, and the first successful attack in Tel Aviv. 22 civilians were killed and 50 were injured. The attack was planned by Hamas chief Yahya Ayyash, on the eve of the signing of the Israel-Jordan Treaty of Peace.

Background
Yahya Ayyash was disappointed that the previous attack he orchestrated, the Hadera central station suicide bombing, had killed six Israelis. The bomb used in that attack had been small and made of acetone peroxide, a relatively weak explosive. For the attack on bus five, Ayyash constructed a bomb using an Egyptian land mine packed with twenty kilograms of military-strength TNT, surrounded by nails and screws. TNT is not readily available in the Palestinian territories, but Hamas had managed to acquire some by smuggling it in or purchasing it from Israeli organized crime. The device "was one of the best ever built by Ayyash."

Qalqilya resident Saleh Abdel Rahim al-Souwi was selected for the attack. Al-Souwi joined Hamas after his older brother Hasin was killed in 1989, in a shootout with Israeli forces. Al-Souwi was wanted by the Israeli Shabak, but was not considered a high priority. The day before the attack, al-Souwi taped a statement saying "It is good to die as a martyr for Allah" and "Sages end up in paradise".

Attack
Muatab Mukadi, a member of Ayyash's Samaria battalion (of the Izz ad-Din al-Qassam Brigades), drove al-Souwi to one of the bus's first stops. al-Souwi chose an aisle seat on the left side of the bus, and placed the bomb (stored in a brown bag) at his feet.

At approximately 9:00 AM, as the bus was slowing down for a stop 100 metres north of Dizengoff Square, al-Souwi detonated the bomb killing 21 Israelis and one Dutch national. The powerful explosion lifted the bus off its chassis and the heat melted the fiberglass bus frame.
Limbs were projected like missiles into the seating area of nearby restaurants.

Following the explosion, a crowd of demonstrators descended on the bomb site chanting "Death to the Arabs". "Police arrested scores of Arab suspects in and around the blast area, though most of them were detained to save them from the crowd's anger."

Aftermath

At the time of the attack, it was the deadliest in Israeli history. However, subsequent bombings have been even more devastating, among them the Jaffa Road bus bombings, the Passover suicide bombing, and the Shmuel Hanavi bus bombing.

Yitzhak Rabin, then Israel's Prime Minister, who was in the United Kingdom on a state visit, immediately returned to Israel. Ayyash's name and pictures of the demolished bus were featured in newspapers around the world.

Israeli police quickly identified al-Souwi as the perpetrator. The day after the bombing, with his identify confirmed using DNA, al-Souwi's family threw a neighborhood party celebrating his "martyrdom." That afternoon, the Israel Security Agency (ISA) destroyed the house, after giving the family one hour to remove their possessions.

References

Further reading
 

Explosions in 1994
1994 in Israel
Mass murder in 1994
Hamas suicide bombings of buses
Terrorist incidents in Tel Aviv
Islamic terrorist incidents in 1994
Islamic terrorism in Israel
Terrorist incidents in Israel in 1994
1994 murders in Israel
1990s in Tel Aviv